Wilhelm Ritter von Manz (6 April 1804 – 5 January 1867) was a Bavarian Lieutenant General and War Minister under Maximilian II of Bavaria from 13 April 1859 to 12 June 1861.

Von Manz was born in Dillingen. After holding several officer positions in the Bavarian army, he became war minister in 1855. Afterwards he served as commander in chief of the Munich garrison, where he died in 1867. On 15 June 1846 he married Adelheid von Zedtwitz.

References and notes 

Bavarian Ministers of War
Bavarian generals
People from the Kingdom of Bavaria
1804 births
1867 deaths
People from Dillingen an der Donau
Military personnel from Bavaria